Michael, Mick or Mike Doyle may refer to:

Politics
Michael Doyle (Irish politician), Irish Farmers' Party politician from Wexford, TD from 1922 to 1927
Michael Doyle, alleged member of the Molly Maguires
Mike Doyle (American politician) (born 1953), U.S. Representative from Pennsylvania

Science and academia
Michael P. Doyle (chemist), American chemist
Michael P. Doyle (microbiologist), American microbiologist
Michael W. Doyle (born 1948), political scientist and former U.N. Assistant Secretary-General

Sport
Michael Doyle (American football) (born 1991), American football player
Michael Doyle (footballer, born 1981), Irish footballer for Notts County
Michael Doyle (footballer, born 1991), Scottish footballer for Queen's Park
Michael Doyle (hurler) (born 1958), former Irish hurler
Michael Doyle (racing driver) (born 1987), competitor in the 2008 British Touring Car Championship
Mick Doyle (hurler) (1889–1970), Irish hurler
Mick Doyle (rugby union) (1941–2004), Irish rugby player and coach
Mike Doyle (footballer) (1946–2011), English footballer for Manchester City

Other
Michael Doyle (hairdresser), Irish hairdresser, stylist and creative director at Peter Mark
Mike Doyle (actor) (born 1972), American actor
Mike Doyle (comedian), Welsh comedian, vocalist, actor and radio presenter
Mike Doyle (24 character), fictional character on the television series 24
Mike Doyle, founder of Eolas